The Last Round Up, The Last Roundup, The Last Round-Up,  or The Last Round-up may refer to:

 The Last Roundup (album), a 2004 album by the band Poco
 The Last Roundup (novel), a series of three novels by Roddy Doyle
 "The Last Roundup" (song), classic western song by Billy Hill
 The Last Round-Up (1934 film), a 1934 Randolph Scott film
 The Last Round-Up (1947 film), a 1947 Gene Autry film
 "The Last Roundup", an episode of the second season of My Little Pony: Friendship Is Magic
 "The Last Roundup", a US cowpunk band